Al-Mehmal Club  is a Saudi Arabian football club based in Thadig. They play in the fourth tier of football in the country, the Saudi Fourth Division.

Notable players
Omar Al-Muziel
Mohammed Qassem

References

Mehmal
1976 establishments in Saudi Arabia
Association football clubs established in 1976